Wuxi Metro is the rapid transit system of Wuxi, Jiangsu province, China. Line 1 began operations on 1 July 2014, and Line 2 on 28 December 2014. Line 3 opened on 28 October 2020. Line 4 opened on 17 December 2021.

Ridership increased from 81.468 million in 2016 to 109.5 million in 2019. Record daily ridership increased from 0.4654 million (5 April 2019) to 526,900 (19 December 2020).

Lines in operation

Line 1

Line 1 runs north to south for  serving 27 stations. Most of the route is underground, with only 5 stations and  running on an elevated alignment. CSR Zhuzhou supplied 23 six-car trainsets for the line.

Line 2 

CSR Puzhen supplied a fleet of 120m-long six-car Type B metro trains for the line.

Line 3 

Line 3 runs east to west for 28.5 kilometers (17.7 mi) with 21 stations.

Line 4 

Line 4 is 25.4 kilometers in length with 18 stations.

Future development

Lines 1, 2 and 3 would be the main lines, radiating from the city center, while Lines 4 and 5 would be the tangential lines for suburb to suburb traffic.  Environmentally friendly and energy efficient designs will be integrated into construction and design of the stations.

Under construction

Line S1
Line S1 of Wuxi Metro, also known as Wuxi–Jiangyin intercity railway or Xicheng line started construction on October 17, 2019. It will be 30.4 km in length with 9 new stations, including 5 underground stations and 4 elevated stations. The line will run from Yanqiao station on Line 1 to Jiangyin Waitan station in Jiangyin (a county-level city administered by Wuxi). Line S1 will through-operate with Line 1. The line will have distinct express and local services.

Line S2
Line S2 of Wuxi Metro, also known as Wuxi–Yixing intercity railway or Xiyi line is under construction. Yixing is a county-level city administered by Wuxi. It will be 58.44 km in length from Yixing railway station to Taihu Xincheng station. Construction of the first phase (Yixing railway station to Zhoutie, about 26 km) started in January 2023.

Phase 3 construction plan (2021-2026)
The Phase 3 construction plan (2021-2026) of Wuxi Metro will add 59.8 km of new lines and extensions.

Long-term plans 
Further plans to build 6 more lines and to connect system with the Shanghai Metro and Suzhou Metro are part of long-term planning.

Special metro cards
In March 2019, the Wuxi Metro began selling "Twin City" metro cards that could be used on both the Ningbo Metro and Wuxi Metro.

Gallery

See also 

 Jiangsu
 List of Metro systems

References

External links

 Wuxi Metro – official website 
 UrbanRail.Net – descriptions of all metro systems in the world, each with a schematic map showing all stations.

 
Rail transport in Jiangsu
Rapid transit in China
Transport in Wuxi